Jelena Nikolić (born 13 April 1982) is a retired Serbian volleyball player, playing as a wing-spiker. She was a member of the Women's National Team that won the silver medal at the 2007 European Championship in Belgium and Luxembourg.

Career
She played for VakıfBank Güneş Sigorta Türk Telekom in Turkey from 2008/2010. With this team Jelena win the 2010–11 CEV Champions League and also winning the "Best Scorer" award.

Nikolić won the gold medal at the 2013 Club World Championship playing with Vakıfbank Istanbul.

Clubs
 OK Obilić Belgrade (1997–1999)
 Reggio Emilia (1999–2002)
 Foppapedretti Bergamo (2002–2003)
 Minetti Infoplus Vincenza (2003–2004)
 RC Cannes (2004–2005)
 Toray Arrows (2005–2006)
 Megius Volley Padova (2006–2007)
 Takefuji Bamboo (2007–2008)
 VakıfBank Güneş Sigorta Istanbul (2008–2014)
 Azeryol Baku (2014–2015)
 Bursa BB (2015–2016)
 Metalleghe Montichiari (2016–)

Awards

Individual
 2010 European Volleyball League "MVP"
 2010 European Volleyball League "Best Receiver"
 2010–11 CEV Champions League Final Four "Best Scorer"

National team

Senior team
 2009 European League -  Gold Medal
 2010 European League -  Gold Medal
 2011 European League -  Gold Medal

Universiade
 2009 Summer Universiade -  Silver Medal

Clubs
 2004/2005 France Championship -  Champion, with RC Cannes
 2004/2005 France Cup -  Champion, with RC Cannes
 2009/2010 Turkish Championship -  Runner-Up, with VakıfBank Güneş Sigorta Türk Telekom
 2010/11 CEV Champions League -  Champion, with VakıfBank Güneş Sigorta Türk Telekom
 2011 FIVB Women's Club World Championship -  Runner-Up, with VakıfBank Türk Telekom
 2011-12 Aroma Women's Volleyball League -  Runner-Up, with Vakıfbank Spor Kulübü
 2013 Club World Championship -  Champion, with Vakıfbank Istanbul

References

External links
 
 Jelena Nikolic at the International Volleyball Federation

1982 births
Living people
Serbian women's volleyball players
Sportspeople from Belgrade
Volleyball players at the 2008 Summer Olympics
Olympic volleyball players of Serbia
VakıfBank S.K. volleyballers
Volleyball players at the 2015 European Games
European Games medalists in volleyball
European Games bronze medalists for Serbia
Volleyball players at the 2016 Summer Olympics
Olympic silver medalists for Serbia
Olympic medalists in volleyball
Medalists at the 2016 Summer Olympics
European champions for Serbia
Expatriate volleyball players in France
Expatriate volleyball players in Italy
Expatriate volleyball players in Japan
Expatriate volleyball players in Turkey
Serbian expatriate sportspeople in Azerbaijan
Serbian expatriate sportspeople in France
Serbian expatriate sportspeople in Italy
Serbian expatriate sportspeople in Japan
Serbian expatriate sportspeople in Turkey
Takefuji Bamboo players
Universiade medalists in volleyball
Universiade silver medalists for Serbia
Medalists at the 2009 Summer Universiade